Stafford is a constituency represented in the House of Commons of the UK Parliament since 2019 by Theodora Clarke, a Conservative.

The seat since its resurrection in 1983 has proven to be somewhat of a bellwether being held always by the incumbent government although it currently has a significantly higher vote share for the Conservatives than the average constituency.

History
Stafford, as a parliamentary borough, first existed between the Model Parliament in 1295 and 1950.

The current constituency was created for the 1983 general election.

Prominent members
The town was represented in Parliament by leading playwright Richard Brinsley Sheridan at the end of the 18th century.

Political history
Taken together with the Stafford and Stone seat which existed during the 33-year gap mentioned above, since 1910 when the last Liberal served the seat, the Conservative party has had five members and the Labour party two (this total includes the present member).  In summary:

Labour saw a bellwether result in their 1945 landslide victory, but Conservative Hugh Fraser regained the seat at the next election in 1950 in the successor seat which he held until his death in 1984.
Effects from the creation of the Stone constituency in 1997 made Stafford somewhat more marginal: sitting Stafford MP Bill Cash followed some of his electors into the Stone constituency, which he won, and after a 47-year lack of a member, Labour's David Kidney gained the constituency in his party's landslide victory in 1997. The defeated Conservative candidate in 1997 was David Cameron, who in the next election was elected as the MP for the safe seat of Witney, and became the Conservative Party leader in 2005, and Prime Minister in 2010.

Boundaries 

1885-1918: The existing parliamentary borough, and so much of the municipal borough of Stafford as was not already included in the parliamentary borough.

1918–1950: The Municipal Borough of Stafford, the Rural District of Gnosall, the Rural District consisting of the civil parishes of Blymhill and Weston-under-Lizard, the Rural District of Stafford except the detached part of the civil parish of Colwich, and part of the Rural District of Cannock.

1983–1997: The Borough of Stafford wards of Baswich, Beaconside, Castletown, Church Eaton, Common, Coton, Doxey, Eccleshall, Forebridge, Gnosall, Highfields, Holmcroft, Littleworth, Manor, Milford, Parkside, Rowley, Seighford, Swynnerton, Tillington, Weeping Cross, and Woodseaves, and the Borough of Newcastle-under-Lyme wards of Loggerheads, Madeley, and Whitmore.

1997–2010: The Borough of Stafford wards of Baswich, Beaconside, Castletown, Common, Coton, Doxey, Forebridge, Haywood, Highfields, Holmcroft, Littleworth, Manor, Milford, Parkside, Rowley, Seighford, Tillington, and Weeping Cross, and the District of South Staffordshire wards of Acton Trussell, Bishopswood and Lapley, Penkridge North East, Penkridge South East, and Penkridge West.

2010–present: The Borough of Stafford wards of Baswich, Castletown, Common, Coton, Doxey, Haywood and Hixon, Highfields and Western Downs, Holmcroft, Littleworth, Manor, Milford, Parkside, Rowley, Seighford, Tillington, and Weeping Cross, and the District of South Staffordshire wards of Penkridge North East and Acton Trussell, Penkridge South East, Penkridge West, and Wheaton Aston, Bishopswood and Lapley.

The constituency forms the southerly part of the borough of Stafford, including the eponymous town itself plus the Penkridge area.

Constituency profile
The town has historical significance, featuring the Elizabethan Ancient High House, a museum with changing exhibitions and Stafford Castle. In terms of industry and commerce, the physics and engineering niche of large power station transformers are produced in the seat whereas the area to the north is famous for fine china, the Staffordshire Potteries from the companies Aynsley, Burleigh, Doulton, Dudson, Heron Cross, Minton, Moorcroft, Twyford, and Wedgwood. The area is also well known for the Staffordshire Hoard, Alton Towers and has a Building Society based in the town.

Workless claimants, registered jobseekers, were in November 2012 significantly lower than the national average of 3.8%, at 2.7% of the population based on a statistical compilation by The Guardian.

Members of Parliament

Stafford parliamentary borough

MPs 1295–1640 

Constituency created (1295)

MPs 1640–1885

MPs 1885–1918

Stafford division of Staffordshire

MPs 1918–1950

Stafford county constituency

MPs since 1983

Elections

Elections in the 2010s

Elections in the 2000s

Elections in the 1990s 
:

Elections in the 1980s 

 Death of Sir Hugh Fraser 6 March 1984

Election in the 1940s

Elections in the 1930s

Elections in the 1920s

Elections in the 1910s

Elections in the 1900s

Elections in the 1890s

Elections in the 1880s

 

 Caused by Macdonald's death.

Elections in the 1870s

Elections in the 1860s

 

 The 1868 election was declared void on petition "on account of corrupt practices", causing a by-election.

 

 
 

 

 Caused by Wise's resignation.

Elections in the 1850s

Elections in the 1840s

 
 

 

 Caused by Carnegie's appointment as a Lord Commissioner of the Treasury

Elections in the 1830s

 
 
 
 

A writ for a by-election was denied for nearly two years.

 
 
 
 
 

 
 
 
 

 Farrand retired before the poll. The election was later declared void and no writ was issued before the 1835 general election.

See also
 1984 Stafford by-election
 List of parliamentary constituencies in Staffordshire

Notes

References

Sources
 
 Britain Votes/Europe Votes By-Election Supplement 1983–, compiled and edited by F.W.S. Craig (Parliamentary Research Services 1985)
 Robert Beatson, A Chronological Register of Both Houses of Parliament (London: Longman, Hurst, Res & Orme, 1807) 
D Brunton & D H Pennington, Members of the Long Parliament (London: George Allen & Unwin, 1954)
Cobbett's Parliamentary history of England, from the Norman Conquest in 1066 to the year 1803 (London: Thomas Hansard, 1808) 
 Henry Stooks Smith, The Parliaments of England from 1715 to 1847, Volume 2 (London: Simpkin, Marshall & Co, 1845)  The Parliaments of England: From 1st George I., to the Present Time
  The History of Parliament: the House of Commons - Stafford, Borough, 1386 to 1832

Parliamentary constituencies in Staffordshire
Borough of Stafford
South Staffordshire District
Constituencies of the Parliament of the United Kingdom established in 1295
Constituencies of the Parliament of the United Kingdom disestablished in 1950
Constituencies of the Parliament of the United Kingdom established in 1983